Cinefest Fairfield is an annual film festival since 2005 featuring short films by students, alumni and faculty of Fairfield University in Fairfield, Connecticut held in association with the Fairfield Community Theatre.  The festival is sponsored by the Department of Visual and Performing Arts and showcases its innovative New Media Program.

Vision for Cinefest Fairfield
"CineFest Fairfield will become a notable annual event for the University and for Fairfield County," Fr. James Mayzik, S.J., Director of the New Media major and Media Center said. "Fairfield students will emerge as leaders within the region and the nation for their creativity and talent in film, television and radio within this exciting new program."

Cinefest Fairfield 2007
Cinefest Fairfield 2007 took place on May 3, 2007 at the Fairfield Community Theatre on Post Road in Fairfield, Connecticut.  The following six awards were presented to Fairfield University students and alumni:

Cinefest Fairfield 2013
Cinefest Fairfield 2013  took place on May 3, 2013, at the Quick Center for the Arts, on Fairfield University Campus.  The following awards were shown and awards were given to the following films.

External links
Cinefest Fairfield Official Website
Fairfield University New Media: Film, Television and Radio Program

References

Fairfield University
Film festivals in Connecticut
Short film festivals in the United States
Student film festivals
Tourist attractions in Fairfield County, Connecticut